Booi is a surname that may refer to
Chumani Booi (born 1980), South African rugby union player 
Dawid Boois (born 1952), Namibian politician and educator
Siyabonga Booi (born 1986), South African cricketer

See also
Booij, Dutch surname, probably of the same origin

 Afrikaans-language surnames